This article summarizes equations in the theory of waves.

Definitions

General fundamental quantities

A wave can be longitudinal where the oscillations are parallel (or antiparallel) to the propagation direction, or transverse where the oscillations are perpendicular to the propagation direction. These oscillations are characterized by a periodically time-varying displacement in the parallel or perpendicular direction, and so the instantaneous velocity and acceleration are also periodic and time varying in these directions.  (the apparent motion of the wave due to the successive oscillations of particles or fields about their equilibrium positions) propagates at the phase and group velocities parallel or antiparallel to the propagation direction, which is common to longitudinal and transverse waves. Below oscillatory displacement, velocity and acceleration refer to the kinematics in the oscillating directions of the wave - transverse or longitudinal (mathematical description is identical), the group and phase velocities are separate.

General derived quantities

Relation between space, time, angle analogues used to describe the phase:

Modulation indices

Acoustics

Equations

In what follows n, m are any integers (Z = set of integers); .

Standing waves

Propagating waves

Sound waves

Gravitational waves

Gravitational radiation for two orbiting bodies in the low-speed limit.

Superposition, interference, and diffraction

Wave propagation

A common misconception occurs between phase velocity and group velocity (analogous to centres of mass and gravity). They happen to be equal in non-dispersive media. In dispersive media the phase velocity is not necessarily the same as the group velocity. The phase velocity varies with frequency.

The phase velocity is the rate at which the phase of the wave propagates in space.
The group velocity is the rate at which the wave envelope, i.e. the changes in amplitude, propagates. The wave envelope is the profile of the wave amplitudes; all transverse displacements are bound by the envelope profile.

Intuitively the wave envelope is the "global profile" of the wave, which "contains" changing "local profiles inside the global profile". Each propagates at generally different speeds determined by the important function called the dispersion relation. The use of the explicit form ω(k) is standard, since the phase velocity ω/k and the group velocity dω/dk usually have convenient representations by this function.

General wave functions

Wave equations

Sinusoidal solutions to the 3d wave equation

N different sinusoidal waves

Complex amplitude of wave n

Resultant complex amplitude of all N waves

Modulus of amplitude

The transverse displacements are simply the real parts of the complex amplitudes.

1-dimensional corollaries for two sinusoidal waves

The following may be deduced by applying the principle of superposition to two sinusoidal waves, using trigonometric identities. The angle addition and sum-to-product trigonometric formulae are useful; in more advanced work complex numbers and fourier series and transforms are used.

See also

Defining equation (physical chemistry)
List of equations in classical mechanics
List of equations in fluid mechanics
List of equations in gravitation
List of equations in nuclear and particle physics
List of equations in quantum mechanics
List of photonics equations
List of relativistic equations
SI electromagnetism units
Wave equation
One-way wave equation

Footnotes

Sources

Further reading

 
 
 
 

Physical quantities
SI units
Physical chemistry
Equations of physics
Equations
Waves